Pieter "Peter" van Doorn (born 29 January 1946) is a retired Dutch cyclist who was active between 1969 and 1975. Between 1969 and 1972 he won four consecutive national titles in the tandem.  He competed at the 1972 Summer Olympics in the sprint, 1 km time trial and 2 km tandem events and finished in fifth, eleventh and fifth place, respectively.

See also
 List of Dutch Olympic cyclists

References

1946 births
Living people
Olympic cyclists of the Netherlands
Cyclists at the 1972 Summer Olympics
Dutch male cyclists
People from Sint-Michielsgestel
Cyclists from North Brabant